Mark Bender Gerstein  is an American scientist working in bioinformatics and Data Science.  , he is co-director of the Yale Computational Biology and Bioinformatics program.

Mark Gerstein is Albert L. Williams Professor of Biomedical Informatics, Professor of Molecular Biophysics & Biochemistry , Professor of Statistics & Data Science, and Professor of Computer Science at Yale University. In 2018, Gerstein was named co-director of the Yale Center for Biomedical Data Science.

Education
After graduating from Harvard College summa cum laude with a Bachelor of Arts in physics in 1989,
Gerstein did a PhD co-supervised by Ruth Lynden-Bell at the University of Cambridge and Cyrus Chothia at the Laboratory of Molecular Biology on conformational change in proteins, graduating in 1993.  He then went on to postdoctoral research in bioinformatics at Stanford University from 1993 to 1996 supervised by Nobel-laureate Michael Levitt.

Research
Gerstein does research in the field of bioinformatics.  This involves applying a range of computational approaches to problems in molecular biology, including data mining and machine learning, molecular simulation, and database design. His research group has a number of foci including annotating the human genome, personal genomics, cancer genomics, building tools in support of genome technologies (such as next-generation sequencing), analyzing molecular networks, and simulating macromolecular motions. Notable databases and tools that the group has developed include the Database of Macromolecular Motions, which categorizes macromolecular conformational change; tYNA, which helps analyze molecular networks; PubNet, which analyzes publication networks; PeakSeq, which identifies regions in the genome bound by particular transcription factors; and CNVnator, which categorizes block variants in the genome. Gerstein has also written extensively on how general issues in data science impact on genomics—in particular, in relation to privacy and to structuring scientific communication.

Gerstein's work has been published in peer reviewed scientific journals and non-scientific publications in more popular forums. His work has been highly cited, with an H greater than 100. He serves on a number of editorial and advisory boards, including those of PLoS Computational Biology, Genome Research, Genome Biology, and Molecular Systems Biology. He has been quoted in the New York Times, including on the front page, and in other major newspapers.

Awards and honors
In addition to a W. M. Keck Foundation Distinguished Young Scholars award, Gerstein has received awards from the US Navy, IBM, Pharmaceutical Research and Manufacturers of America, and the Donaghue Foundation. He is a Fellow of the AAAS. Other awards include a Herchel-Smith Scholarship supporting his doctoral work at Emmanuel College, Cambridge and a Damon Runyon Cancer Research Foundation Postdoctoral Fellowship. He is a contributor to a number of scientific consortia including ENCODE, modENCODE, 1000 Genomes Project, Brainspan, and DOE Kbase. He was made a Fellow of the International Society for Computational Biology in 2015.

References

External links

 Mark Gerstein Laboratory at Yale
 Mark Gerstein at Yale Computer Science
 Mark Gerstein at Yale School of Medicine
 
 Mark Gerstein publications on ResearchGate
 

21st-century American biologists
American bioinformaticians
Harvard College alumni
Stanford University alumni
Year of birth missing (living people)
Living people
Yale University faculty
Fellows of the International Society for Computational Biology
Fellows of the American Association for the Advancement of Science
Alumni of Emmanuel College, Cambridge
Yale Department of Molecular Biophysics & Biochemistry faculty